The following is a list of Michigan State Spartans men's basketball head coaches. There have been 16 head coaches of the Spartans in their 123-season history.

Michigan State's current head coach is Tom Izzo. He took over as the Spartans' head coach in March 1995, replacing Jud Heathcote, who retired after the 1994–95 season.

References

Michigan State

Michigan State Spartans basketball, men's, coaches